Mike Kelly (born 20 November 1967) is an American-Australian professional basketball coach and former player who is the associate head coach for the Perth Wildcats of the National Basketball League (NBL). He spent the majority of his playing career in the NBL, where he won a championship with the South East Melbourne Magic in 1996 and was a two-time Best Defensive Player selection.

Professional career

Kelly began his career at Mater Dei High School in Santa Ana, California, during which he was part of a team with a 29–0 record that won the 1985 CIF Championship. He then moved to Orange Coast College in Costa Mesa, and stayed there for two years.

During his time at Orange Coast College he was recruited by Westmont College in the Golden State Athletic Conference (GSAC), where he was a two-time All-GSAC player and helped Westmont win the 1988 NAIA District III Championship.

Following his college career, Kelly spent one year in Taiwan playing for the Lucky Cement Basketball Team before moving to Australia. Upon arrival in Australia, Kelly spent time with the Griffith Demons (1990), the North East Melbourne Arrows (1991–1993) and the Nunawading Spectres (1994–1995), before joining the South East Melbourne Magic for the 1996 NBL season.

During his first season in the NBL, Kelly played major minutes and averaged 33 minutes and 5.2 rebounds per game. In his inaugural season he won the NBL Best Defensive Player Award and won a Championship with the Magic.

Kelly remained with the Magic for the 1997 NBL season, and was once again awarded the NBL Best Defensive Player Award. He also helped the Magic reach the Grand Final again, however they were beaten by the Melbourne Tigers 2–1.

Kelly moved to a brand new club for the 1998 season; the Victoria Titans. During his two year stay with the club, they reached the finals twice and the Grand Final once.

For the 2000–01 NBL season Kelly moved clubs again, this time to the Townsville Crocodiles. Fresh off a 22–6 record the previous year, the club repeated that record and reached the Grand Final, however lost in a tight contest with the Wollongong Hawks 2–1.

After multiple successful years, the Crocodiles struggled in the 2001–02 season and the early part of the 2002–03 season, however a 16-game winning streak pushed the club into the finals. Despite their best efforts, they were pushed out of the finals by the Wollongong Hawks and the Sydney Kings.

Kelly joined the Wollongong Hawks for the 2004–05 NBL season, during which they reach the Grand Final. However, they were beaten 3–0 by the Sydney Kings.

Kelly remained with the Wollongong Hawks for the 2005–06 NBL season, however only played four games before retiring.

Coaching career
After finishing his NBL career in 2005, Kelly continued his involvement with the Wollongong Hawks in the role of assistant coach for two seasons, before he returned to America in 2007 to coach a college team. Kelly joined a brand new coaching team at Vanguard University, however left in 2008 to join Utah Valley University.

After an extended stint at Utah Valley, Kelly returned to the NBL to coach his former club the Townsville Crocodiles. He remained with the club for one season, but moved to Melbourne United for the 2015–16 NBL season due to the Crocodiles continued financial difficulties.

Kelly joined Melbourne United in 2015 as an associate head coach, and helped guide the club to the playoffs in 2016 and the championship in 2018.

On 14 April 2018, Kelly joined the Cairns Taipans as their head coach on a two season contract after the club sacked Aaron Fearne. Kelly won his first regular season game as head coach (88–70 vs Brisbane Bullets), however his team then went on a 14 game losing streak. The club finished the season with a 6–22 record and finished at the bottom of the ladder, with half the wins of the next team.

In his second year in Cairns, Kelly's team improved and nearly tripled their wins from the previous season to finish in third on the ladder with a 16-12 record, an achievement which shocked most people across the NBL. After winning the Coach of the Year award and announcing that he had resigned with the club on a two-year deal, the Taipans lost 2–1 in the semi-finals to the Perth Wildcats, who would later go on to win the championship.

In his third season with the club, the Taipans returned to the bottom of the ladder with a 8–28 record. On 31 March 2021, the Taipans announced that Kelly would not be returning to the club for the 2021–22 season.

On 26 July 2021, Kelly was announced as the associate head coach of the Perth Wildcats on a two-season contract.

References

External links

NBL stats
Nunawading Basketball Hall of Fame

1967 births
Living people
American men's basketball players
Basketball players from California
Nunawading Spectres players
South East Melbourne Magic players
Shooting guards
Small forwards
Townsville Crocodiles players
Victoria Giants players
Wollongong Hawks players
Cairns Taipans coaches